Grant Earl Mouser (September 11, 1868 – May 6, 1949) was a U.S. Representative from Ohio for two terms from 1905 to 1909.

He was the father of Grant E. Mouser Jr., who also became a United States Congressman from Ohio.

Biography 
Born in LaRue, Ohio, Mouser attended the LaRue Union Schools and Ohio Northern University, Ada, Ohio. He graduated from the Cincinnati Law School in 1890 and was admitted to the bar the same year. He commenced practice of law in Marion, Ohio, where he served as prosecuting attorney of Marion County from 1893 to 1896. He served as a delegate to many state conventions.

Family and personal life 
Mouser was the son of Dr. Justus and Sara (DeLong) Mouser.

Mouser married Della E. Ridgway, of LaRue, November 28, 1892. They had three children: Helena, Grant Earl Jr., and Annabel.

Mouser was a member of the Presbyterian Church, B.P.O.E., K. of P. and I.O.O.F.

Congress 
In 1904 Mouser ran for and was elected as a Republican to the 59th Congress. He successfully ran for re-election in 1906, serving in the 60th Congress.

Later career 
He was an unsuccessful candidate for reelection in 1908 to the 61st Congress.

After the election, he resumed practicing law in Marion until his retirement in 1935. He also served as delegate to the 1908 Republican National Convention. From 1916 to 1925, he served as a judge in the Court of Common Pleas of Marion County.

Harding patrimony controversy
Mouser cross examined Nan Britton in Britton's lawsuit (Britton v. Klunk), in which she claimed that the late U.S. President Warren G. Harding was the father of her daughter Elizabeth Ann Blaesing. Britton was unable to provide any concrete evidence, and was shaken by the vicious personal attacks made by Mouser, which cost her the case. Carl Sferrazza Anthony, author of Florence Harding, a biography of Harding's wife, wrote that court transcripts in Toledo, Ohio show that Mouser referred to Britton as a "degenerate and pervert," and "brought (Florence Kling Harding) in by using Warren's 'love of his good wife' against a 'distorted... deranged... demented... [and] diabolical' Nan who had no respect for the marriage tie...."

DNA testing in 2015 confirmed that Blaesing was indeed Harding's daughter.

Death
Mouser died in Marion, Ohio, May 6, 1949 and is interred in Marion Cemetery.

References

External links

1868 births
1949 deaths
People from Marion, Ohio
University of Cincinnati College of Law alumni
Ohio Northern University alumni
County district attorneys in Ohio
Ohio lawyers
People from LaRue, Ohio
Republican Party members of the United States House of Representatives from Ohio